In mathematics, a divisor of an integer , also called a factor of , is an integer  that may be multiplied by some integer to produce .

Definition
An integer  is divisible by a nonzero integer  if there exists an integer  such that . This is written as

Usually,  is required to be nonzero, but  is allowed to be zero. With this convention,  for every nonzero integer . Some definitions omit the requirement that  be nonzero.

General
Divisors can be negative as well as positive, although sometimes the term is restricted to positive divisors. For example, there are six divisors of 4; they are 1, 2, 4, −1, −2, and −4, but only the positive ones (1, 2, and 4) would usually be mentioned.

1 and −1 divide (are divisors of) every integer. Every integer (and its negation) is a divisor of itself. Integers divisible by 2 are called even, and integers not divisible by 2 are called odd.

1, −1, n and −n are known as the trivial divisors of n. A divisor of n that is not a trivial divisor is known as a non-trivial divisor (or strict divisor). A nonzero integer with at least one non-trivial divisor is known as a composite number, while the units −1 and 1 and prime numbers have no non-trivial divisors.

There are divisibility rules that allow one to recognize certain divisors of a number from the number's digits.

Examples

7 is a divisor of 42 because , so we can say . It can also be said that 42 is divisible by 7, 42 is a multiple of 7, 7 divides 42, or 7 is a factor of 42.
The non-trivial divisors of 6 are 2, −2, 3, −3.
The positive divisors of 42 are 1, 2, 3, 6, 7, 14, 21, 42.
The set of all positive divisors of 60, partially ordered by divisibility, has the Hasse diagram:

Further notions and facts
There are some elementary rules:

This is called Euclid's lemma.

An integer  whose only proper divisor is 1 is called a prime number. Equivalently, a prime number is a positive integer that has exactly two positive factors: 1 and itself.

This is a consequence of the fundamental theorem of arithmetic.

For instance, ; the eight divisors of 42 are 1, 2, 3, 6, 7, 14, 21 and 42. However, the number of positive divisors is not a totally multiplicative function: if the two numbers  and  share a common divisor, then it might not be true that . Both of these functions are examples of divisor functions.

and each of the divisors has the form

where  for each 

For every natural , .

Also,

where  is Euler–Mascheroni constant.
One interpretation of this result is that a randomly chosen positive integer n has an average
However, this is a result from the contributions of numbers with "abnormally many" divisors.

In abstract algebra

Ring theory

Division lattice

In definitions that include 0, the relation of divisibility turns the set  of non-negative integers into a partially ordered set: a complete distributive lattice. The largest element of this lattice is 0 and the smallest is 1. The meet operation ∧ is given by the greatest common divisor and the join operation ∨ by the least common multiple. This lattice is isomorphic to the dual of the lattice of subgroups of the infinite cyclic group .

See also
 Arithmetic functions
 Euclidean algorithm
 Fraction (mathematics)
 Table of divisors — A table of prime and non-prime divisors for 1–1000
 Table of prime factors — A table of prime factors for 1–1000
 Unitary divisor

Notes

References 

Richard K. Guy, Unsolved Problems in Number Theory (3rd ed), Springer Verlag, 2004 ; section B.

Øystein Ore, Number Theory and its History, McGraw–Hill, NY, 1944 (and Dover reprints).

Elementary number theory
Division (mathematics)